The 1902 Purdue Boilermakers football team was an American football team that represented Purdue University during the 1902 Western Conference football season. In their first season under head coach Charles Best, the Boilermakers compiled a 7–2–1 record, finished in fifth place in the Western Conference, and outscored their opponents by a total of 315 to 68. Harry G. Leslie was the team captain.

Schedule

References

Purdue
Purdue Boilermakers football seasons
Purdue Boilermakers football